"Cuando Hay Amor" ("When There Is Love") is a song by Cuban-American singer Gloria Estefan. It was officially released on June 12, 2020, as the lead single from Estefan's fourteenth studio album, Brazil305 (2020). It was written by Emilio Estefan, Nicolás Tovar and newcomer, Andrea López. It is a Latin pop song considered a celebration of love set to the beat of Brazilian and Colombian drums.

Release
Originally slated for release in Fall 2019, the single was pushed back to Summer 2020. It was Estefan's first song in seven years and serves as the lead single of her album, Brazil305 which was released in August 2020.

Music video
The same date it was released, a music video was made available and features Estefan dancing Samba de Roda along with a group of Brazilian women of all ages. Filmed in Salvador, Bahia, was shot in front of Lagoa do Abaeté, the lake where the original Bahianas, at the end of the 19th century, would do their washing while singing and improvising songs. Some scenes were also shot in Rio de Janeiro.

Charts

Weekly charts

Year-end charts

References

External links

 
2020 singles
Gloria Estefan songs
Songs written by Emilio Estefan
Song recordings produced by Emilio Estefan
2020 songs